Afti Einai I Diafora Mas (Greek: Αυτή είναι η διαφορά μας, English: This is our difference) is the eleventh studio album by Greek singer Despina Vandi. The album released under the label Heaven Music on October 6, 2016.

Background
The cover of the album was published by Heaven Music's promo webpage HeavenPromo.com on September 28, 2016. Videos and audio samples of the songs, published on that webpage from September 16 to October 6, 2016.

Singles and music videos
"Mia Anasa Makria Sou"
The song was released as a digital download on 9 November 2015 and is the lead single of the album. The video clip of the song was announced on 9 December 2015, from Heaven Music's YouTube Channel.

"To Maksilari"
The first live presentation of the song was in «To Proino: Christougenna Mazi» on 24 December 2015. The single was released onto YouTube by Heaven Music on 19 January 2016. The song was released as a digital download on 20 January 2016.

"Gia Kaki Mou Tihi"
The single was released onto YouTube by Heaven Music and released as a digital download on 4 April 2016. The video clip of the song was announced on 1 June 2016, from Heaven Music's YouTube Channel.

"Perasa Na Do"
The single was released onto YouTube by Heaven Music on 25 September 2016. The song was released as a digital download on 26 September 2016.

"Afti Einai I Diafora Mas"
The song was released as a digital download on 11 January 2017.

"Kati Pige Lathos"
The song was released as a digital download on 25 April 2017.

"Oti Thes Geniete Tora"
The song was released as a digital download on19  June 2017. The video clip of the song was announced on 28 August 2017, from Heaven Music's YouTube Channel.

Track listing

Release history

Charts

Credits and personnel

Personnel 
Christos Bousdoukos: violin (tracks: 2)

Panagiotis Mprakoulias: backing vocals, keyboards, orchestration, programming (tracks: 10, 12) || baglama, cümbüş (tracks: 12) || guitars (tracks: 2, 4, 10, 12) || outi (tracks: 2, 4) || säzi (tracks: 2, 4, 12)

Sotiris Chasiotis: guitars (tracks: 5, 9)

Thanasis Chondros: bass (tracks: 5)

Akis Diximos: backing vocals (tracks: 2, 4, 5, 9)

Vasilis Gavriilidis: keyboards, orchestration, programming (tracks: 1, 3, 6, 11, 13)

Nikos Gkiouletzis: violin (tracks: 11, 13)

Antonis Gounaris: baglama, mandolin (tracks: 13) || cümbüş (tracks: 1, 6) || guitars (tracks: 6, 13) || tzoura (tracks: 1, 6, 13)

Giannis Grigoriou: bass (tracks: 1, 3, 6, 8, 10, 11, 12, 13)

Katerina Kiriakou: backing vocals (tracks: 2, 4, 9)

Spiros Kontakis: guitars (tracks: 1, 3, 11)

Dimitris Kontopoulos: keyboards, orchestration, programming (tracks: 7, 9)

Giorgos Kostoglou: bass (tracks: 9)

Kostas Lainas: accordion (tracks: 10) || keyboards (tracks: 10, 12)

Kostas Laskarakis: drums (tracks: 5)

Tasos Liberis: percussion (tracks: 2, 10, 12)

Alkis Misirlis: drums (tracks: 1, 3, 9, 11, 13) || percussion (tracks: 13)

Andreas Mouzakis: drums (tracks: 10, 12)

Vasilis Nikolopoulos: keyboards (tracks: 10, 12) || programming (tracks: 12)

Stavros Papagiannakopoulos: baglama, bouzouki (tracks: 5)

Elena Patroklou: backing vocals (tracks: 1, 6)

Stavros Pazarentsis: clarinet (tracks: 3, 11)

Michalis Porfiris: cello (tracks: 5)

Stefania Rizou: backing vocals (tracks: 7)

Gabriel Russell: guitars, keyboards, orchestration, programming (tracks: 8)

Giorgos Sousounis: viola (tracks: 10) || violin (tracks: 10, 12)

Leonidas Tzitzos: keyboards, orchestration, programming (tracks: 1, 2, 4, 5, 6, 11, 13)

Evripidis Zemenidis: guitars (tracks: 7)

Production 
Kiriakos Asteriou (Bi-Kay studio): mix engineer, sound engineer (tracks: 1, 3, 6, 11, 13)

Aris Mpinis (Vox studio): mix engineer (tracks: 2, 4, 5, 7, 8, 9) || sound engineer (tracks: 2, 4, 5, 7, 8, 9, 10, 12)

Babis Biris (Bi-Kay studio): sound engineer (tracks: 10, 12)

Panagiotis Brakoulias (Track Factory Recording studio): mix engineer, sound engineer (tracks: 10, 12)

Giorgos Christodoulatos (Sweet Spot studio): mastering

Giannis Doxas: executive producer

Vasilis Nikolopoulos (Track Factory Recording studio): mix engineer (tracks: 10, 12)

Cover 
Christos Alexandropoulos: styling

Elena Athanasopoulou: art direction

Vaso Nakopoulou: make up

Dimitris Skoulos: photographer

Vasilis Stratigos: hair styling

Credits adapted from the album's liner notes.

References

External links
Official website

2016 albums
Despina Vandi albums
Heaven Music albums
Greek-language albums